Kill the Messenger is a 2014 American biographical crime thriller film directed by Michael Cuesta and written by Peter Landesman. It is based on the book of the same name by Nick Schou and the book Dark Alliance by Gary Webb. The film stars Jeremy Renner, who also produced the film. The film was released on October 10, 2014, and depicts a reporter's suppressed attempts to cover the CIA involvement and secret support of large scale cocaine sales to fund the Nicaraguan Contras.

Plot
In 1996, San Jose Mercury News reporter Gary Webb interviews drug dealer Ronny Quail, who is outraged that the government used civil asset forfeiture to keep his house even after he was acquitted. Webb's ensuing article about the abuses of forfeiture garners repeated phone calls from a woman named Coral, whom he agrees to meet when she says she has documents that prove the government sponsored cocaine sales in the U.S. Coral gives Webb a transcript of grand jury testimony (normally kept secret) which was accidentally released to her boyfriend, an accused drug dealer, during discovery. After Webb reveals to the prosecutor in the case that he has the transcript, the government drops the charges against Coral's boyfriend in order to protect their main witness: Oscar Danilo Blandón.

After Webb researches Blandón and comes across the pending case of "Freeway" Rick Ross, he is stunned to learn that Blandón is a paid informant. Armed with this knowledge, Ross' attorney elicits from Blandón his sworn testimony outlining the CIA's alleged involvement in Contra cocaine trafficking—that the CIA actively supported Blandón and his partners’ smuggling of cocaine into the U.S. and used the profits to benefit the Nicaraguan Contras.

Webb travels to a prison in Managua and speaks to Blandón's partner, Norwin Meneses, who confirms Oliver North's involvement in the basic "drugs for guns" scheme to use profits from cocaine trafficking to fund the Contras. In Washington, D.C., Webb tracks down Fred Weil, a National Security Council employee who was an investigator on the Kerry Committee report, which touched on the same issues. Like many other people that Webb speaks to, Weil warns him that the subject may put him in danger. For good measure, federal agents summon Webb to a meeting where they warn him against publishing what he has learned.

The paper publishes Webb's story as a three-part series with the title "Dark Alliance"; it is an immediate sensation. Humiliated by being scooped by a regional paper, the Los Angeles Times, Washington Post, and The New York Times all dig into Webb's reporting. Webb views their follow-up reporting as being far too deferential to the CIA. Eventually, their reporting turns to Webb himself, including an affair he had while working at The Plain Dealer.

Webb is banished to the newspaper's Cupertino bureau to cover mundane local news. However, he continues to work on the story. He is awakened in his motel room one night by John Cullen, who is precisely the kind of CIA source with direct knowledge of the scheme that Webb's reporting needs. Webb's exhilaration at finding Cullen is quickly dampened when the paper reveals its plans to write an open letter calling into question aspects of its "Dark Alliance" reporting. At a Society of Professional Journalists dinner honoring Webb as the Bay Area "Journalist of the Year", he submits his resignation to his editors. An epilogue reveals that in 2004 Gary Webb was found dead in his apartment, shot twice in the head. His death was ruled a suicide.

Cast

 Jeremy Renner as Gary Webb
 Rosemarie DeWitt as Susan Webb
 Ray Liotta as John Cullen
 Tim Blake Nelson as Alan Fenster
 Barry Pepper as Russell Dodson
 Mary Elizabeth Winstead as Anna Simons
 Paz Vega as Coral Baca
 Oliver Platt as Jerome Ceppos
 Michael Sheen as Fred Weil
 Richard Schiff as Walter Pincus
 Andy García as Norwin Meneses
 Robert Patrick as Ronny Quail
 Michael K. Williams as "Freeway" Rick Ross
 Jena Sims as Little Hottie
 Joshua Close as Rich Kline
 Yul Vazquez as Danilo Blandon
 Robert Pralgo as Sheriff Nelson
 Lucas Hedges as Ian Webb
 Michael Rose as Jonathan Yarnold
 Matthew Lintz as Eric Webb
 Michael H. Cole as Pete Carey
 David Lee Garver as Douglas Farah
 Andrew Masset as Johnathan Krim

Production
The script was written by former journalist Peter Landesman. 
The film was initially devolved at Universal in 2008 but it was put in turnaround and moved to their Focus Features subsidiary, which was more focussed on independent projects. Jeremy Renner joined the film as star and producer before funding had been secured, and helped to get the film financed independently.

On March 5, 2014, Focus Features announced that the film would be released on October 10, 2014.

Filming
Principal photography began on July 16, 2013 in several Georgia locations, including Atlanta, Cobb County and Decatur.

Music
Nathan Johnson composed the score for the film, and Back Lot Music released a soundtrack album on October 7, 2014.

Release
Kill the Messenger received a regional theatrical release by Focus Features on October 10, 2014.

Several weeks after the Kill the Messenger premiere, the significant lack of advertising for the film and its rapid retraction from theaters led to the creation of a petition to re-release the film in theaters on November 24, 2014 through Change.org, entitled "Focus Features: Support Gary Webb and Re-Release Kill the Messenger in Theaters."

This petition was also spurred on after Focus Features failed to attend a private screening for the film hosted by the Writers Guild of America in mid-November, despite positive reviews for the film. Through the petition and direct appeals to Focus Features, attention was drawn to the fact that the film distribution company aired more national television commercials for Kill the Messenger six weeks after the premiere date than they did before the film was released in theaters, and almost exclusively outside of primetime hours and off of major broadcasting companies.

As a result of this marketing campaign, the highest domestic television coverage for Kill the Messenger occurred when it had been retracted from all but 18 theaters in the United States and three weeks before its theatrical run was ended. Attention was also drawn to the large discrepancy in the amount of television advertising that Focus Features gave to each of its fall releases, specifically between Kill the Messenger, which was given a total of 448 national advertisements, to Theory of Everything, which was nationally aired 3,046 times and largely on major television networks (i.e., ABC, NBC, CBS, MTV).

The petition picked up a strong momentum through social media, accruing over 2,000 signatures in less than two weeks. 
 The weekend of December 5, Focus Features expanded Kill the Messenger to 19 additional theaters, for a sum of 27 theaters overall.

On December 11, Universal Pictures Home Entertainment announced the DVD release date for Kill the Messenger, several days before the petition reached 2,500 signatures.

In early February, Kill the Messenger was leaked online, and was reportedly among the top ten films with the most unauthorized downloads for several weeks.

Reception

Box office
Kill the Messenger grossed $2.5 million in the United States and Canada, and $4.2 million in other territories, for a worldwide total of $6.7 million, against a production budget of 5 million. Sales of its DVD/Blu-ray releases cashed $3.3 million.

Critical reception

The film has received generally positive reviews from critics. On Rotten Tomatoes, the film holds a "Certified Fresh" rating of 77%, based on 131 reviews, with an average rating of 6.6/10. The site's consensus reads, "Kill the Messengers potent fury over the tale of its real-life subject overrides its factual inaccuracies and occasional narrative stumbles." On Metacritic, the film has a score of 60 out of 100, based on 36 critics, indicating "mixed or average reviews".

Andrew Barker of Variety wrote: "The film taps into far deeper, richer veins of material than it has the time to properly mine. It’s nonetheless a flinty, brainy, continually engrossing work that straddles the lines between biopic, political thriller and journalistic cautionary tale, driven by Jeremy Renner’s most complete performance since The Hurt Locker."

Accolades

See also
 CIA involvement in Contra cocaine trafficking
 Gary Webb

References

External links
 
 
 

2014 films
2014 crime thriller films
2014 independent films
2010s biographical films
2010s mystery thriller films
American biographical films
American crime thriller films
American independent films
American mystery thriller films
Biographical films about journalists
Films about the Central Intelligence Agency
Films about cocaine
Films about the illegal drug trade
Films based on biographies
Films based on multiple works
Films directed by Michael Cuesta
Films produced by Scott Stuber
Films scored by Nathan Johnson (musician)
Films set in the 1990s
Films set in San Jose, California
Films set in Nicaragua
Films set in Washington, D.C.
Films shot in Atlanta
Films shot in Georgia (U.S. state)
Films with screenplays by Peter Landesman
Focus Features films
Thriller films based on actual events
2010s English-language films
2010s American films